Jackson Rogow (born October 5, 1991) is an American actor. He is best known for starring in the Cartoon Network live action series Dude, What Would Happen?

Career
Rogow was on Dude, What Would Happen on Cartoon Network until it was cancelled in 2011. Rogow was also on the Lego Top Secret Project after The Yoda Chronicles on Cartoon Network.

Personal life
Rogow resides in Bel Air, Los Angeles, California.

Filmography

References

External links 

Living people
1991 births
People from Kissimmee, Florida
People from Bel Air, Los Angeles
Los Angeles County High School for the Arts alumni
American male television actors